Baum is a German surname meaning "tree" (not to be confused with the French surname Baume). Notable people with this surname include:

 Bernie Baum (1929–1993), American songwriter
 Carol Baum, American film producer
 Christina Baum (born 1956), German politician
 Dale Baum, (born 1943), American historian and professor
 Edgar Schofield Baum (1916–2006), American artist, physician, and WW2 combat medical officer
 Fran Baum,  Australian social scientist
 Frank Baum (footballer) (born 1956), German footballer
 Frank Joslyn Baum (1883–1958), American lawyer, soldier, writer and film producer
 Friedrich Baum (1727–1777), colonel in British service during the American revolutionary war
 Gerhart Baum (born 1932), German lawyer and minister of the interior
 Henry Baum (born 1972), American writer
 James Edwin Baum (1887-1955), American journalist and big game hunter
 Jiří Baum (1900–1944), Czech zoologist
 L. Frank Baum (1856–1919), American author (The Wonderful Wizard of Oz), actor, and independent filmmaker
 Michael Baum (surgeon) (born 1937), British surgical oncologist who specialises in breast cancer treatment
 Oskar Baum (1883–1941), Czech music educator and writer
 Otto Baum (1911-1998), German high-ranking commander (Oberführer) of the Waffen-SS
 Paul Baum (artist) (1859–1932), German landscape painter
 Paul Baum (mathematician) (born 1936), American mathematician
 Peter Baum (born 1990), American lacrosse player
 Ray Baum (1955-2018), American lawyer and politician
 Roger S. Baum (born 1938), American banker, now children's author
 Tom Baum (born 1940), American screenwriter and playwright
 Vicki Baum (1888–1960), Austrian writer
 Walter Baum (1921–2007), German type designer
 Walter Emerson Baum (1884–1956), Pennsylvania impressionist painter
 Wilhelm Baum (historian), (born 1948), Austrian historian, publisher
 Wilhelm Baum (surgeon) (1799–1883), German surgeon
 William Wakefield Baum (1926–2015), American Roman Catholic cardinal

See also 
 eBaum's World
 Baum–Welch algorithm
 Baum School of Art
 Baum test (Tree Test)
 Task Force Baum
 Baume (surname)
 Bohm (disambiguation)
 

German-language surnames
Jewish surnames
Surnames from nicknames